Ortholepis subgenistella is a moth of the family Pyralidae. It was described by George Hampson in 1901. It is found in South Africa.

References

Endemic moths of South Africa
Moths described in 1901
Phycitini